Watseka is a city in and the county seat of Iroquois County, Illinois, United States.

The population of Watseka was 5,255 according to the 2010 census, which was a 7.3 percent decrease from the 2000 census.

History
Incorporated in 1865, the name "Watseka" derives from the Potawatomi name "Watch-e-kee", "Daughter of the Evening Star", the wife of early eastern Illinois settler Gurdon Saltonstall Hubbard.

The Old Iroquois County Courthouse was constructed in 1866, with two additions built in 1881 and 1927. In the early 1960s, an Iroquois County resident, Mrs. Katherine Clifton, bequeathed to the county in her will a large sum of money and a site upon which to build a new courthouse.  It is the only courthouse in the United States built entirely with private funds.

The old courthouse was advertised for sale and fell into disuse. In 1967, during the Centennial Celebration of Watseka, the Iroquois County Historical Society was organized, and circulated petitions throughout the county not to sell the Old Courthouse. The petitions were approved by the County Board of Supervisors, and the Old Courthouse re-opened as a museum that same year. In 1975, the Old Courthouse was listed on the National Register of Historic Places.

Geography

Watseka is located near the center of Iroquois County, at the intersection of U.S. Route 24 and Illinois Route 1. The Iroquois River winds along the north side of the town and is joined by Sugar Creek on the west side of town. The south half of the town is in Belmont Township; the north half is in Middleport Township.

Climate

Demographics

As of the census of 2000, there were 5,670 people, 2,314 households, and 1,483 families residing in the city. The racial makeup of the city was 96.75% White, 0.62% African American, 0.26% Native American, 0.48% Asian, 0.86% from other races, and 1.02% from two or more races. Hispanic or Latino of any race were 2.61% of the population.

There were 2,314 households, out of which 28.8% had children under the age of 18 living with them, 49.3% were married couples living together, 11.2% had a female householder with no husband present, and 35.9% were non-families. Of all households 31.2% were made up of individuals, and 15.8% had someone living alone who was 65 years of age or older.  The average household size was 2.35 and the average family size was 2.93.

In the city, the population was spread out, with 23.7% under the age of 18, 8.1% from 18 to 24, 25.1% from 25 to 44, 21.6% from 45 to 64, and 21.6% who were 65 years of age or older.  The median age was 40 years. For every 100 females, there were 89.8 males.  For every 100 females age 18 and over, there were 83.7 males.

The median income for a household in the city was $30,440, and the median income for a family was $40,000. Males had a median income of $30,516 versus $19,680 for females. The per capita income for the city was $16,638.  About 12.7% of families and 15.4% of the population were below the poverty line, including 22.1% of those under age 18 and 8.6% of those age 65 or over.

Notable people

 Fern Andra (1893–1974; birth name Vernal Andrews), circus performer, actress, early film director
 Henry Bacon (1866–1924), architect of Lincoln Memorial in Washington, D.C., and other notable public buildings
 Fred Bechly (1924–2004), electrical engineer and inventor in field of color television broadcasting
 Edward Bechly (1874–1945), editor, publisher, and proprietor of Iroquois County Times-Democrat 
 Craig Calhoun (1952–), economist and educator, Director of London School of Economics and Political Science (2012–2016); President of   Berggruen Institute (2016–)
 Sam Campbell (1895–1962), popular author and nature enthusiast
 P.C. Cast, young adult author (House of Night series)
 Frank M. Crangle (1861–1934), Illinois state representative and lawyer
 Rex Everhart (1920–2000), musical theatre and voice actor (Beauty and The Beast)
 Mike L. Fry, original Happy the Hobo on the nationally syndicated children's television series Happy's Place 
 A.E. Henning, City Council member of Los Angeles (1929–1933)
 Curtis Painter (born 1985), NFL quarterback 2009–2014; played collegiate football at Purdue University; formerly a starter for Indianapolis Colts
 Harold Reetz (born 1948), agronomist and former President of the Foundation for Agronomic Research.
 Sam Rice, Hall of Fame baseball outfielder, 1924 World Series champion
 Vaughn R. Walker (born 1944), chief judge of United States District Court for the Northern District of California, noted for presiding over Perry v. Schwarzenegger
 Mary Margaret Whipple (born 1940), former Virginia state senator
 Gordie Windhorn (born 1933), former Major League Baseball player

See also
 Watseka Wonder

References

External links

Cities in Iroquois County, Illinois
Cities in Illinois
County seats in Illinois
Populated places established in 1865